Yasmine Klai (born 15 September 2002) is a French-born Tunisian footballer who plays as a midfielder for the Olympique Lyonnais youth team and the Tunisia women's national team.

International career
Klai has capped for Tunisia at senior level, including a 2021 Arab Women's Cup match against Lebanon on 24 August 2021.

See also
List of Tunisia women's international footballers

References

External links

2002 births
Living people
Citizens of Tunisia through descent
Tunisian women's footballers
Women's association football midfielders
Tunisia women's international footballers
Footballers from Lyon
French women's footballers
French sportspeople of Tunisian descent